Dominique Maximilien Gardères (born 22 October 1856 in Biarritz, date of death unknown) was a French horse rider who competed in the 1900 Olympic Games. In Paris he tied to the gold medal in the high jump event with Gian Giorgio Trissino.

References

External links

French male equestrians
Olympic gold medalists for France
Olympic equestrians of France
Equestrians at the 1900 Summer Olympics
1856 births
Year of death missing
Olympic medalists in equestrian
Medalists at the 1900 Summer Olympics
Place of death missing
Sportspeople from Biarritz